Gyamar Nikum (born 26 October 2004) is an Indian professional footballer who plays as a midfielder for Indian Super League club Mumbai City.

He is the one of the youngest players and first from Arunachal Pradesh in history to be selected and debut in the I-League Qualifiers, at an age of 16 years and 359 days.

Club career

Youth career
Hailing from the town of Naharlagun in Arunachal Pradesh's Papum Pare district, Nikum started playing football at the tender age of 8. By the age of 14, he had played in the U15 sub-junior national championships for Arunachal Pradesh.

On 2019, Nikum achieved a career milestone when he was selected for the Arunachal Pradesh team to play in the U18 BC Roy Trophy, where they made it to the semi-finals. It was in that tournament where the midfielder was scouted by Rajasthan United and offered a chance to be a part of their residential academy in Bhilwara. After impressing then coach Vikrant Sharma, he was fast tracked to the first-team squad.

Rajasthan United
On 20 October 2021, Nikum became one of the youngest players and first from Arunachal Pradesh in history to be selected and debut in the I-League Qualifiers, when he appeared against Madan Maharaj, at an age of 16 years and 359 days.

Nikum had a breakout 2021–22 season, where he appeared in fourteen of their eighteen games as Rajasthan United had a memorable debut season in the I-League, finishing in the top 7 of Phase 1 and qualifying for the Championship stage.

In July 2022, Nikum signed a new four-year contract extension with Rajasthan United. On 20 August, he scored his first and the winning goal for the club in a shock 3–2 win over ATK Mohun Bagan, in the Durand Cup.

Mumbai City 
On 22 January 2023, 18 year-old Nikum joined Mumbai City for a reported transfer fee of ₹6–7.5 million on a four and a half-year contract, with an option to extend further. The transfer fee is a record for a player of his age.

International career
In June 2022, Nikum got called up by the AIFF for the India U20 training camp in Bhubaneswar, Odisha.

Career statistics

Club

Honours
Mumbai City FC
Indian Super League (Premiership) : 2022-23

References

2004 births
Living people
People from Kurung Kumey district
Footballers from Arunachal Pradesh
Indian footballers
Rajasthan United FC players
Mumbai City FC players
I-League players
Indian Super League players
Association football midfielders